Tell Neba'a Litani or Neba'a Litani is a medium size tell  west of Baalbek in the northern Beqaa Valley of Lebanon. It was first studied by Lorraine Copeland and Peter Wescombe in 1965-1966 and is accessible via a road which turns from Hoch Barada to the left. Materials recovered included flint tools such as scrapers and the blade from a segmented sickle. Pottery included burnished, painted and red-washed shards, some with incised decoration or lattice patterns. The material resembled finds from Byblos and Ard Tlaili leading Copeland and Wescombe to suggest a late Neolithic occupation for the tell that extended into the Bronze Age.

References

1965 archaeological discoveries
Neolithic settlements
Archaeological sites in Lebanon
Great Rift Valley